The Roman Catholic Archdiocese of Nanchang is an archdiocese based in the city of Nanchang in China.

History
1696: Established as Apostolic Vicariate of Kiangsi from the Apostolic Vicariate of Chekiang and Kiangsi
 1838: Suppressed to the Apostolic Vicariate of Chekiang and Kiangsi
 1846: Restored as Apostolic Vicariate of Kiangsi from the Apostolic Vicariate of Chekiang and Kiangsi
 August 19, 1879: Renamed as Apostolic Vicariate of Northern Kiangsi
 August 25, 1920: Renamed as Apostolic Vicariate of Jiujiang
 December 3, 1924: Renamed as Apostolic Vicariate of Nanchang
 April 11, 1946: Promoted as Metropolitan Archdiocese of Nanchang

Leadership
 Archbishops of Nanchang 南昌 (Roman rite)
 Archbishop John Wu Shi-zhen (1991–2014)
 Archbishop Joseph Zhou Ji-shi, C.M. (周濟世) (July 18, 1946 – 1972)
 Vicars Apostolic of Nanchang 南昌 (Roman Rite)
 Bishop Paul-Marie Dumond, C.M. (July 3, 1931 – February 19, 1944)
 Bishop Louis-Élisée Fatiguet, C.M. (February 24, 1911 – February 13, 1931)
 Vicars Apostolic of Northern Kiangsi 江西北境 (Roman Rite)
 Bishop Paul-Léon Ferrant, C.M. (September 24, 1905 – November 5, 1910)
 Bishop Géraud Bray, C.M. (August 19, 1879 – September 24, 1905)
 Vicars Apostolic of Kiangsi 江西 (Roman Rite)
 Bishop Géraud Bray, C.M. (March 15, 1870 – August 19, 1879)
 Bishop François-Xavier Danicourt, C.M. (顧方濟) (1854 – February 2, 1860)
 Bishop Louis-Gabriel Delaplace, C.M. (田嘉璧 / 田類斯) (February 27, 1852 – June 12, 1854)
 Bishop Bernard-Vincent Laribe, C.M. (March 26, 1846 – July 20, 1850)

Suffragan dioceses
 Ganzhou 贛州
 Ji’an 吉安
 Nancheng 南城
 Yujiang 餘江

Sources

 GCatholic.org
 Catholic Hierarchy

Roman Catholic dioceses in China
Religious organizations established in 1696
Religion in Jiangxi
Nanchang
Roman Catholic dioceses and prelatures established in the 17th century
1696 establishments in Asia